DWW may refer to:

Dawawa language
Dawlish Warren railway station, Dawlish, England
Directing Workshop for Women, a US film organization
Doctor Who Weekly, now Doctor Who Magazine, a magazine devoted to the TV series Doctor Who
Down with Webster, a Canadian rap rock band
Down with Webster (album), a 2007 self-titled album
DWW, a 1992 album by French electronic rock band Heldon
Distrowatch weekly, a weekly publication of the news website DistroWatch

See also
DWWW, an AM radio station in Quezon City, Philippines